Margaret Kerdeston (after 1425 – after 5 December 1485), Countess of Kendal (Candale), was the paternal grandmother of Anne of Foix-Candale, queen of Hungary and Bohemia.

Life
She was the daughter of Sir Thomas Kerdeston (d. 1446) and Elizabeth de la Pole. Her mother was a daughter of Michael de la Pole, 2nd Earl of Suffolk and sister of William de la Pole, 1st Duke of Suffolk. She married John de Foix, 1st Earl of Kendal, and gave birth to four children, including Gaston de Foix, Count of Candale.

She is buried at the church of Castelnau-de-Médoc with her husband.

Children
From her husband, John de Foix, 1st Earl of Kendal:
Gaston de Foix, Count of Candale (ca. 1448-1500), whose 1st wife was Infanta Catherine of Navarre (ca. 1455 – before 1494); their issue included Anne of Foix-Candale queen of Hungary; Gaston's 2nd wife was Isabel of Albret, the daughter of Alain I of Albret (d. ca. 1530), with whom be fathered other children.
John (d. 1521) viscount of Meille in Aragon, count of Fleix and Gurson, his wife Anne de Villeneuve (d. 1567): issue, the dukes of Randan.
Catherine (d. 1510), her husband Charles I, Count of Armagnac (1425–1497): without issue
Margaret (d. 1534/36), her husband, Ludovico II, Marquess of Saluzzo (1438–1504): issue.

Notes

Bibliography
Kropf, Lajos: Anna királyné, II. Ulászló neje (Queen Anne of Foix-Candale, the Consort of Ladislas II). Századok (Periodical Centuries) 29. 689-709. 1895.

External links
Les Foix-Candale
Seigneurs de Grailly Généalogie
Foix-Grailly Généalogie

1426 births
Year of death missing
House of Foix
Earls of Kendal
Counts of Candale